In the run-up to the 2019 Turkish local elections held on 31 March, various pollsters conducted opinion polls to gauge voting intentions in Turkey's major cities. Additionally, a number of polls were gauged to predict overall vote shares in the local election. This page lists these polls conducted by city, listing the most recent studies first.

Overall opinion polling
The below table shows nationwide opinion polls conducted to gauge overall vote shares.

By province

Istanbul

Ankara

Adana

Bursa

Eskişehir

Antalya

Hatay

Balıkesir

Denizli

Şanlıurfa

References

2019 Turkish local elections
Turkish local elections
2019 Turkish local elections